Iodoform (also known as triiodomethane and, inaccurately, as carbon triiodide) is the organoiodine compound with the chemical formula CHI3. A pale yellow, crystalline, volatile substance, it has a penetrating and distinctive odor (in older chemistry texts, the smell is sometimes referred to as that of hospitals, where the compound is still commonly used) and, analogous to chloroform, sweetish taste.  It is occasionally used as a disinfectant.

Structure
The molecule adopts tetrahedral molecular geometry with C3v symmetry.

Synthesis and reactions
The synthesis of iodoform was first described by Georges-Simon Serullas in 1822, by reactions of iodine vapour with steam over red-hot coals, and also by reaction of potassium with ethanolic iodine in the presence of water; and at much the same time independently by John Thomas Cooper. It is synthesized in the haloform reaction by the reaction of iodine and sodium hydroxide with any one of these four kinds of organic compounds: a methyl ketone (CH3COR), acetaldehyde (CH3CHO), ethanol (CH3CH2OH), and certain secondary alcohols (CH3CHROH, where R is an alkyl or aryl group).

The reaction of iodine and base with methyl ketones is so reliable that the iodoform test (the appearance of a yellow precipitate) is used to probe the presence of a methyl ketone. This is also the case when testing for specific secondary alcohols containing at least one methyl group in alpha-position.

Some reagents (e.g. hydrogen iodide) convert iodoform to diiodomethane.  Also conversion to carbon dioxide is possible: Iodoform reacts with aqueous silver nitrate to produce carbon monoxide. When treated with powdered elemental silver the iodoform is reduced, producing acetylene. Upon heating iodoform decomposes to produce diatomic iodine, hydrogen iodide gas, and carbon.

Natural occurrence
The angel's bonnet mushroom contains iodoform, and shows its characteristic odor.

Applications
The compound finds small-scale use as a disinfectant.  Around the beginning of the 20th century, it was used in medicine as a healing and antiseptic dressing for wounds and sores and, although this use is now largely superseded by superior antiseptics, it is still used in otolaryngology in the form of bismuth subnitrate iodoform paraffin paste (BIPP) as an antiseptic packing for cavities. It is the active ingredient in many ear powders for dogs and cats, along with zinc oxide and propionic acid, which are used to prevent infection and facilitate removal of ear hair.

See also
 Iodoform reaction
 Fluoroform 
 Chloroform
 Bromoform

References
Randhawa GK, Graham R, Matharu KS,   Bismuth Iodoform Paraffin Paste: History and uses.   British Journal of Oral and Maxillofacial Surgery. 2019;67:E53-E54.

External links

MSDS at JT Baker
A Method for the Specific Conversion of Iodoform to Carbon Dioxide
Preparation

Iodoalkanes
Halomethanes
Antiseptics
Iodine-containing natural products